Easley Peak is an  mountain summit located on the common border that Blaine County shares with Custer County, in Idaho, United States.

Description
Easley Peak ranks as the 100th-highest peak in Idaho and is situated on the crest of the Boulder Mountains which are a subset of the Rocky Mountains. The mountain is set 18 miles northwest of Ketchum, Idaho, in the Hemingway–Boulders Wilderness on land managed by Sawtooth National Forest. The peak can be seen from Highway 75 and Galena Summit. Precipitation runoff from the mountain's slopes drains south to the Big Wood River and north into headwaters of the South Fork of East Fork Salmon River. Neighbors include line parent Cerro Ciento one mile to the north and Boulder Peak four miles to the east-southeast. This landform's toponym has been officially adopted by the United States Board on Geographic Names. John V. Easley was a pioneer who moved to this area around 1880 and opened a stage station at nearby Easley Hot Springs.

Climate
Based on the Köppen climate classification, Easley Peak is located in an alpine subarctic climate zone with long, cold, snowy winters, and cool to warm summers. Winter temperatures can drop below −10 °F with wind chill factors below −30 °F.

See also
 List of mountain peaks of Idaho

References

External links
 Easley Peak: Idaho: A Climbing Guide
 Easley Peak: weather forecast

Mountains of Idaho
Mountains of Blaine County, Idaho
Mountains of Custer County, Idaho
North American 3000 m summits
Sawtooth National Forest